= Emilie Feldman =

American business theorist

Emilie R. Feldman (c. 1982) is an American business theorist. Feldman graduated from Harvard College and Harvard Business School, and subsequently joined the Wharton School of the University of Pennsylvania in 2010, where she is the Michael L. Tarnopol Professor of Management.
